Fairwater Films is a British animation studio based in Cardiff.

Notable staff
 Tony Barnes (producer, director, screenwriter)
 James Driscoll (executive producer, screenwriter)

Selected filmography
 Hanner Dwsin (1985)
 The Shoe People (1987-1988)
 Satellite City (1988)
 Dr. Zitbag's Transylvania Pet Shop (1994-1998)

References
 Planète Jeunesse - Satellite City
 The Times (UK) Saturday, Jan 05, 1985; pg. 29; Issue 62028 (Regional Television Variations)

British animation studios